Jurgita Petrauskienė is a Lithuanian politician. She served as Minister of Education and Science in the cabinet of Prime Minister Saulius Skvernelis from 13 December 2016 to 7 December 2018. Algirdas Monkevičius was appointed as her successor.She was born 1975 march 30th in Utena. Now she is married to her former classmate Evaldas Petrauskas. She also has two children Jonas and Julija.

References 

Living people
Year of birth missing (living people)
Place of birth missing (living people)
21st-century Lithuanian politicians
Ministers of Education and Science of Lithuania
Women government ministers of Lithuania